Marc Laurent (born 29 May 1947) is a French yacht racer who competed in the 1976 Summer Olympics.

References

1947 births
Living people
French male sailors (sport)
Olympic sailors of France
Sailors at the 1976 Summer Olympics – 470
470 class world champions
World champions in sailing for France